Young v. American Mini Theatres, 427 U.S. 50 (1976), is a case in which the Supreme Court of the United States upheld a city ordinance of Detroit, Michigan requiring dispersal of adult businesses throughout the city.

Justice Stevens (writing for the plurality) reasoned that the speech involved here is of lower value, and the city also has a compelling interest in protecting quality of life.

Justice Powell (concurring) disagreed with Stevens' "lower value speech" argument (thus limiting Part III of the opinion to a plurality), but wrote that this is only a place restriction with a limited effect on speech.

See also
List of United States Supreme Court cases, volume 427
List of United States Supreme Court cases by the Burger Court
List of United States Supreme Court cases involving the First Amendment

External links

United States Supreme Court cases
United States Supreme Court cases of the Burger Court
United States obscenity case law
1976 in United States case law
Legal history of Michigan
Theatres in Detroit